Bernard E. Wilmoth House is a historic home located at Belington, Barbour County, West Virginia, United States. It was built in 1911–13, and is a -story Queen Anne-style house. It is built of speckled tan-colored bricks. It features a variety of window styles and a large verandah on one and one half sides of the house.

It was listed on the National Register of Historic Places in 1984.

References

Houses completed in 1913
Houses in Barbour County, West Virginia
Houses on the National Register of Historic Places in West Virginia
National Register of Historic Places in Barbour County, West Virginia
Queen Anne architecture in West Virginia
1913 establishments in West Virginia